The XPeng P5 is a battery-powered subcompact sedan produced by the Chinese electric car company XPeng. It is the first mass-produced car to be equipped with lidar sensors for advanced driver-assistance systems (ADAS).

History

At Auto Shanghai in April 2021, XPeng presented the third model of its brand, complementing the offer as a cheaper and smaller alternative to the flagship P7. It took the form of a compact 4-door sedan.

In terms of styling, the P5 developed on the styling concept of the larger P7, distinguishing itself by a gently sloping roof line towards the short, slender ending of the rear part of the body. Headlights made in LED technology were connected by a light strip between them, while the charging port was located in the right front fender.

The passenger compartment is kept in a minimalist design, dominated by a vast vertical multimedia system touch screen located at an angle between the edge of the dashboard and the central tunnel, characterised by a 15.6-inch diagonal. The vehicle is equipped with a third-generation Xmart OS 3.0 multimedia system with a voice control function.

The P5 is the first mass-produced car in history to be optionally equipped with the advanced LiDAR Technology autonomous driving system. It consists of sensors cooperating with a laser ladar that scans the surroundings of the car at a distance of 150 metres in the range of 150 degrees, including traffic lights, other moving vehicles, as well as pedestrians and cyclists moving nearby. The 32 sensors include two LiDARs, 12 ultrasonic and 5 microwave sensors and 13 high-resolution image processing cameras. With future OTA improvements, the P5 has the hardware capable of L4 Autonomous driving. 

Sales of the P5 started in the fourth quarter of 2021, beginning in the Chinese market. It generated a lot of attention during its premiere. Within 53 hours of its debut, XPeng collected 10,000 orders for the P5. In 2022, they planned to start selling the vehicle also in selected Western European markets, starting with Norway.

Drivetrain
The car is for now only available in front-wheel drive and maybe later as all-wheel drive.

References

External links

All-wheel-drive vehicles
Cars introduced in 2021
Compact executive cars
Production electric cars
Rear-wheel-drive vehicles
Sports sedans
P5